Suwon Sports Complex is a group of sports facilities in Suwon, South Korea. The complex consists of the Suwon Stadium, Suwon Baseball Stadium, and Suwon Gymnasium.

Facilities

Suwon Stadium 
Suwon Stadium is a multi-purpose stadium and currently used mostly for football matches. Built in 1971, it has a capacity of 11,808 seats and was home of the Suwon Samsung Bluewings until 2001, when they moved to the Suwon World Cup Stadium.

Suwon Baseball Stadium 
 For details, see Suwon Baseball Stadium.

Suwon Gymnasium 
 For details, see Suwon Gymnasium.
The gymnasium, with a capacity of 5,145, was built in 1963 and hosted the handball events of the 1988 Summer Olympics.

Gallery

See also
 Suwon Gymnasium
 Suwon Baseball Stadium

References

External links

 Official website 
 World Stadiums

Football venues in South Korea
Sports venues in Suwon
Athletics (track and field) venues in South Korea
Multi-purpose stadiums in South Korea
Suwon FC
Suwon FC Women
Suwon Samsung Bluewings
Sports venues completed in 1971
K League 1 stadiums
K League 2 stadiums
1971 establishments in South Korea
20th-century architecture in South Korea